Fresh Del Monte Produce Incorporated is one of the world’s leading vertically integrated producers, distributors,
and marketers of fresh and fresh-cut fruits and vegetables. Their products
include prepared fruit and vegetables, juices, beverages, snacks, and desserts, and are sold in more than 90 countries around the world.  

Fresh Del Monte Produce markets its fresh products worldwide under the Del Monte, UTC, ROSY and other brands. A key product is its Del Monte Gold pineapple. Although no longer affiliated with Del Monte Foods, Del Monte Produce continues to market pineapples, bananas, and other produce under a licensing agreement for the Del Monte label. 

Fresh Del Monte also operates a shipping line called Network Shipping and has a trucking operation called Tricont Trucking. In addition, they have food and beverage operations that sell freshly prepared food products in convenient locations. 

Fresh Del Monte Produce was created in 1989 when RJR Nabisco sold the fresh fruit division of Del Monte Foods to Polly Peck. After the collapse of Polly Peck, Fresh Del Monte was sold to Mexican businessman Carlos Cabal Peniche. Cabal fled Mexico after being accused of fraud and the Mexican government seized Fresh Del Monte. Mohammed Abu-Ghazaleh purchased Fresh Del Monte in 1996. The company went public in 1997. Fresh Del Monte acquired Del Monte Europe in 2004. In 2018, Fresh Del Monte Produce acquired American vegetable packer Mann Packing.

Fresh Del Monte Produce is incorporated in George Town, Cayman Islands. The U.S. executive office is located at 241 Sevilla Avenue, Coral Gables, Florida.

See also
Chiquita Brands International 
Del Monte Foods
 Del Monte Kenya
Dole Food Company 
Fyffes

References

External links 

Agriculture companies of the United States
Food and drink companies of the United States
Companies listed on the New York Stock Exchange
Del Monte Foods
Companies based in Miami-Dade County, Florida
Agriculture companies established in the 19th century
1886 establishments in California
Food and drink companies established in 1886
American companies established in 1886